Haimovich is an Ashkenazi Jewish surname from the Slavic patronymic Haimovich (son of Haim). Notable people with the surname include:

 Miki Haimovich (born 1962), Israeli politician and television presenter
 Ze'ev Haimovich (born 1983), Israeli footballer

Jewish surnames